Kikusui Station (菊水駅) is a Sapporo Municipal Subway station in Shiroishi-ku, Sapporo, Hokkaido, Japan. The station number is T11.

Platforms

Surrounding area
 Japan National Route 36
 Sapporo City Hall Building
 National Hospital Organization Hokkaido Cancer Center
 Sapporo Kin'ikyo Hospital
 Hokkaido Computer School HCS, (college)
 Shiraishi Police Department
 Sapporo Kikusui Sanjo Post Office
 ARCS super store, Kikusui
 Maxvalu supermarket, Kikusui

Gallery

External links

 Sapporo Subway Stations

 

Railway stations in Japan opened in 1976
Railway stations in Sapporo
Sapporo Municipal Subway